Bellisime Glacier is a glacier about  long flowing south from Thurston Island east of Myers Glacier. It was named by the Advisory Committee on Antarctic Names after Lynda B. Bellisime of the United States Geological Survey (USGS), Flagstaff, Arizona, part of the USGS team that compiled the 1:5,000,000-scale Advanced Very High Resolution Radiometer maps of Antarctica and the 1:250,000-scale Landsat TM image maps of the Siple Coast area in the 1990s.

See also
 List of glaciers in the Antarctic
 Glaciology

Maps
 Thurston Island – Jones Mountains. 1:500000 Antarctica Sketch Map. US Geological Survey, 1967.
 Antarctic Digital Database (ADD). Scale 1:250000 topographic map of Antarctica. Scientific Committee on Antarctic Research (SCAR). Since 1993, regularly upgraded and updated.

References 

 

Glaciers of Thurston Island